Ivan Nebesnyy (born July 15, 1971) is a Ukrainian composer and music producer. 

Graduated from Lviv Conservatory in 1995 (composer class under Myroslav Skoryk). In 1996 Ivan Nebesnyy founded an ensemble "Cluster" which performed music by modern composers from Ukraine and abroad. In 2006 – 2011 Ivan Nebesnyy was a music director of the “Kyiv Music Fest”.

Selected works 
Works by Ivan Nebesny are considered as postmodern. Among them:

 An opera, Fox Mykyta, based on the poem by Ivan Franko (premiered in Lviv opera in 2020);
 Heavenly Shchedryk, for carillon, mixed choir, children’s choir, symphony orchestra and soundtrack with the sounds of Maidan Nezalezhnosti;
 What Zarathustra did not say about for violin, piano, percussion and tape;
 Music for Drama theatre, soundtracks and others.

Honors
Levko Revutsky award (2002),
Mykhailo Verykivsky award (2011)),
Kyiv Pectoral award (2011)), 
Boris Lyatoshinsky award (2020)

References

Links
Official page

Ukrainian composers
1971 births
Living people
20th-century classical composers
21st-century classical composers